Burnley Greyhound Stadium also known as Towneley Stadium was a former greyhound racing and speedway stadium in Burnley, Lancashire.

Origins and Opening
South of Burnley there was a large open space known as Towneley Park which served Towneley Hall and the Towneley family for five centuries. In 1902 the estate was sold to the Burnley Corporation and despite the fact that most of the park remained in situ they did agree the sale of a plot of land that ran alongside the River Calder and the Hall's north access road. This ten-acre plot was in the area known as Towneley Holmes.

The stadium could be accessed from either the east or west side, on the west side the path was opposite the Smalley Street junction with Woodgrove Road and cut across Towneley Park meeting the Hall's north access road. The stadium kennels were adjacent to this path situated on the north side of the stadium. From the east there was footbridge over the River Calder that met the Hall's north access road. Whichever entry was chosen resulted in the same turnstile entrances on the east side of the stadium being used where the main stand overlooked the course.

A local company with a share capital of £13,000 purchased and constructed the greyhound track which was a very large 570 yards in circumference. The first race night was held on 3 September 1927 with seven thousand attending the meeting opened by Lady O’Hagan.

History
The greyhounds initially housed at the Burnley track consisted of 100 brought mainly from Hull. The stadium came under the control of a company called the Associated Greyhound Racecourses with Towneley becoming their second of three tracks that they would eventually own. The first being Darnall Stadium and the third was the Old Craven Park in Hull.

Haulage businessman Bill Sharples had a litter out of track bitch Calliope, sired by Grand National finalist Douro and trainers included Jack Hillman (a former England goalkeeper) and Jack Ashworth. In 1931 just four years after opening the Associated Greyhound Racecourses went bankrupt with the track then being taken over by a local businessman named W Spencer who closed the stadium blaming the government betting bill that restricted the days that tracks could race. With meetings limited to a maximum of 101 per annum the management put the stadium, kennels and equipment up for auction.

Speedway
A Burnley speedway team were formed and they joined the inaugural 1929 Speedway English Dirt Track League but withdrew mid-season and had their results expunged.

Closure
During 1935 the stadium was taken over by Captain Ramsbottom who had replaced Harry Bury as the judge and handicapper under a previous promotion. Ramsbottom then made a quick profit by selling onto two brothers Dr. and Clem Hodgson with the last greyhound meeting taking place on 2 November 1935.
The buildings associated to the stadium (stands, shelters and kennels) were demolished and the track was filled in as the site became playing fields.

A golf course then spread its wings north and incorporated the site into the course. The position of the stadium today would have been on the northerly holes of a golf course, exactly on the opposite side of the River Calder to the £33 million Unity College.

References

Defunct greyhound racing venues in the United Kingdom
Defunct speedway venues in England
1927 establishments in England
Sports venues completed in 1927
1935 disestablishments in England
Sports venues demolished in 1935
Defunct sports venues in Lancashire